Mohammad-Ali Khan was a Safavid official and military commander of Lezgian origin. He served as a commander-in-chief of the army (sepahsalar) and as a governor (hakem) of the Erivan Province (also known as Chokhur-e Sa'd), during the reign of king Sultan Husayn (1694-1722). 

A nephew of grand vizier Fath-Ali Khan Daghestani (1716-1720), Mohammad-Ali Khan served during the chaotic years in which the Safavid state was crumbling and in a state of heavy decline. He was killed in 1716 following a revolt by the people of his province, and was succeeded by his twelve-year old (unnamed) son, who was also appointed governor (vali) of Georgia and of Tabriz.

References

Sources
  
 

1716 deaths
Safavid governors of Erivan
Iranian people of Lezgian descent
Commanders-in-chief of Safavid Iran
18th-century people of Safavid Iran